On 26 May 2014, an express train travelling from Gorakhpur town to Hisar collided with a stationary goods train at Chureb railway station in Khalilabad north India, killing at least 40 people and injuring another 150. Prime-minister-elect Narendra Modi expressed his condolences at the time, on Twitter.

References

Railway accidents in 2014
Derailments in India
2014 disasters in India
Sant Kabir Nagar district
May 2014 events in India
Railway accidents and incidents in Uttar Pradesh
History of Uttar Pradesh (1947–present)